Val d'Europe is a railway station on the RER A line in Val d'Europe, the eastmost part of the new town of Marne-la-Vallée.

The station's full name is Serris – Montévrain – Val d'Europe, a recognition that the station serves more specifically the communes of Serris and Montévrain. The station also serves the nearby neighbourhoods of Chessy and Jossigny and the large shopping mall of Val d'Europe.

History 
The district of Val d'Europe was planned and developed in conjunction with The Walt Disney Company, who wished to create a new town near the Disneyland Paris resort. Thus, on 1 April 1992, RER line A was extended to Marne-la-Vallée – Chessy to serve Disneyland Paris.

To achieve the objective of better serving the communes of the Val d'Europe, which was then in full expansion, and the Val d'Europe mall newly established, Val d'Europe station was built as an infill station on the already operating RER line and opened on 14 April 2001.

Traffic 
Val d'Europe station has seen its ridership increase, in ten years, from zero to three million passengers in 2011.

, the estimated annual attendance by the RATP Group was 4,656,709 passengers.

Services 
The station has three accesses :
 the first one towards Serris and Chessy, the shopping mall and the bus station;
 the second one towards Montévrain;
 and the third one towards the hospital of Jossigny.

RER A 
The station is served by a train every 10 minutes to Paris and to Marne-la-Vallée–Chessy. From 10 pm, frequency drops to 1 train every 30 minutes. Service starts at 5:16 am to Paris, at 5:53 am to Marne-la-Vallée–Chessy and stops at 0:23 am to Paris and at 1:13 to Marne-la-Vallée–Chessy.

Bus connections 
The station is served by several buses in a large bus station:

 Pep's: 02, 22, 32, 34, 42, 43, 44, 46
 Seine-et-Marne Express Bus: 16, 18
 Marne et Morin (Grand Morin): 06, 19, 58, 60, 69-Express
 Disneyland shuttle: MS Selected, HCU
  Noctilien:  (between Paris (Gare de Lyon) and Marne-la-Vallée–Chessy – Disneyland)

Gallery

References 

Réseau Express Régional stations
Railway stations in France opened in 2001
Railway stations in Seine-et-Marne